Hinksey Hill is a hill and residential area  south of the centre of Oxford. Hinksey Hill was part of Berkshire until the 1974 boundary changes transferred it to Oxfordshire.

At the foot of the hill is Hinksey Hill Interchange where the Abingdon By-Pass joins the Southern By-Pass Road.  The road up the hill was the route of the A34 until the 1970s, when the Abingdon Bypass was completed.  It is now an unclassified road.

At the summit of Hinksey Hill is the Old Berkeley Golf Course which was the former private golf course of Lord Berkeley of Berkeley Castle on Boars Hill. The land is now preserved as a nature reserve and it a great spot for dog walking and observing the great views of the city of Oxford painted many times by William Turner.

Much of the land on Hinksey Hill was owned by the Earls of Abingdon until it was sold by the 7th Earl in Acre sized plots throughout the 1910s

Home to the Priors a local philanthropic family.

See also
 Hinksey

External links
 Oxford from Hinksey Hill by William Turner (1789–1862).

Hills of Oxfordshire
Hamlets in Oxfordshire